Epsilon Eridani b, also known as AEgir , is an exoplanet approximately 10.5 light-years away orbiting the star Epsilon Eridani, in the constellation of Eridanus (the River). The planet was discovered in 2000, and as of 2022 remains the only confirmed planet in its planetary system. It orbits at around 3.5 AU with a period of around 7.6 years, and has a mass around 0.6 times that of Jupiter. , both the Extrasolar Planets Encyclopaedia and the NASA Exoplanet Archive list the planet as 'confirmed'.

Name
The planet and its host star are one of the planetary systems selected by the International Astronomical Union as part of NameExoWorlds, their public process for giving proper names to exoplanets and their host star (where no proper name already exists). The process involved public nomination and voting for the new names. James Ott, age 14, submitted the names for the IAU contest and won.

The moon Aegir of Saturn is also named after the mythological Ægir, and differs in spelling only by capitalization.

Discovery 

The planet's existence was suspected by a Canadian team led by Bruce Campbell and Gordon Walker in the early 1990s, but their observations were not definitive enough to make a solid discovery. Its formal discovery was announced on August 7, 2000, by a team led by Artie Hatzes. The discoverers gave its mass as 1.2 ± 0.33 times that of Jupiter, with a mean distance of 3.4 AU from the star.  Observers, including Geoffrey Marcy, suggested that more information on the star's Doppler noise behaviour created by its large and varying magnetic field was needed before the planet could be confirmed.

In 2006, the Hubble Space Telescope made astrometric measurements and confirmed the existence of the planet. These observations indicated that the planet has a mass 1.5 times that of Jupiter and shares the same plane as the outer dust disk observed around the star. The derived orbit from these measurements is eccentric: either 0.25 or 0.7.

Meanwhile, the Spitzer Space Telescope detected an asteroid belt at roughly 3 AU from the star. In 2009 one team of astronomers claimed that the proposed planet's eccentricity and this belt were inconsistent: the planet would pass through the asteroid belt and rapidly clear it of material. The planet and the inner belt may be reconciled if that belt's material had migrated in from the outer comet belt (also known to exist).

Astronomers continue to collect and analyse radial velocity data, while also refining existing upper limits from non-detection via direct imaging, on Epsilon Eridani b. A paper published in January 2019 found an orbital eccentricity with an order of magnitude smaller than earlier estimates had, at around 0.07, consistent with a nearly circular orbit and very similar to Jupiter's orbital eccentricity of 0.05. This resolved the stability issue with the inner asteroid belt. The updated measurements, amongst other things, also included new estimates for the mass and inclination of the planet, at 0.78 times that of Jupiter but due to the inclination having been poorly constrained at 89 degrees this was only a rough estimate of the absolute mass. If the planet instead orbited at the same inclination as the debris disc (34 degrees), as supported by Benedict et al. 2006, then its mass would have been greater, at 1.19 times that of Jupiter.

Using astrometric data taken from the U.S. Naval Observatory Robotic Astrometric Telescope (URAT) combined with previously collected data from the Hipparcos mission, and the newer Gaia EDR3 data release, a group of scientists at the United States Naval Observatory believe they have, with high formal confidence levels, confirmed the presence of a long-period exoplanet orbiting Epsilon Eridani.

A paper published in October 2021 determines, using absolute astrometry measurements from the Hipparcos, Gaia DR2 data, and new radial velocity measurements from Keck/NIRC2 Ms-band vortex coronagraph images, a lower absolute mass of 0.65 times that of Jupiter, at an eccentricity close to 0.055 with the planet orbiting at around 3.53 AU inclined at 78 degrees. Similar updated findings were published in a paper in July 2021, determining a minimum mass of 0.651 that of Jupiter, with the planet's semi-major axis at 3.5 AU orbiting with an eccentricity of 0.044. A March 2022 paper finds an inclination of 45 degrees, closer to earlier estimates, a mass 0.63 times that of Jupiter, and an eccentricity of 0.16.

See also 

 47 Ursae Majoris b
 51 Pegasi b
 List of nearest exoplanets

Notes

References

External links 
Epsilon Eridani b at The Extrasolar Planets Encyclopaedia. Retrieved 2020-05-04.
Epsilon Eridani b at The NASA Exoplanet Archive. Retrieved 2020-05-04.

Eridanus (constellation)
Exoplanets detected by radial velocity
Exoplanets detected by astrometry
Exoplanets discovered in 2000
Giant planets
Exoplanets with proper names